Qaleh-ye Someh (also Romanized as Qal‘eh-ye Someh; also known as Qal‘eh-ye Sowmeh) is a village in Manj Rural District, Manj District, Lordegan County, Chaharmahal and Bakhtiari Province, Iran. At the 2006 census, its population was 158, in 25 families. The village is populated by Lurs.

References 

Populated places in Lordegan County
Luri settlements in Chaharmahal and Bakhtiari Province